Aleksander Arak (1 February 1883 in Helme Parish (now Tõrva Parish), Kreis Fellin – 2 December 1969) was an Estonian politician, agronomist and pedagogue. He was a member of Estonian National Assembly.

References

1883 births
1969 deaths
People from Tõrva Parish
People from Kreis Fellin
Members of the Estonian National Assembly
Estonian agronomists
Burials at Pärnamäe Cemetery